St. Patrick's Academy is the name of a closed Catholic grammar school that was located in Chicago, Illinois. It was founded in 1883 by the Sisters of Mercy.

St. Patrick's was located on the northwest corner of Oakley Avenue and Washington Boulevard.  The school was across the street from St. Malachy's parish school. The school closed in 1969. It served a small group of children (about 120, in eight grades and kindergarten) from all over Chicago with heavy representation from the Italian, Irish and Polish communities.  Class sizes were small and two grades often occupied the same classroom.  Children traveled to the school by school bus, private and public transportation.

The large building that housed the school also provided rooms for single women who worked in the nearby Chicago Loop.

References

External links 
 Chicago Sisters of Mercy early history
 Lowe, F.H. (2000) "Keeping the Faith" In The Chicago Reader. 

Defunct private schools in Chicago
Educational institutions established in 1883
1883 establishments in Illinois
Educational institutions disestablished in 1969
Catholic elementary schools in Illinois